The following is a list of characters from the Back Arrow animated TV series.

Characters

Main Characters

An amnesiac young man who emerged from a Rakuho capsule that landed in Edger Village. He claims his only memory is that he is from "beyond the wall" and seeks to return despite people believing nothing exists past the wall. He takes his alias from Bit calling him an idiot ("blunt arrow" in the English dub). His Briheight  is a blue and white humanoid. Lacking a solid Conviction, Muga is composed of a malleable gel-like material that absorbs physical attacks and is capable of feats generally thought impossible for Briheights, primarily the ability to destroy Briheights without killing the operator. Muga is also capable of shapeshifting and unlocking new abilities seemingly on Arrow's whim, such as morphing into a sword other Briheights can wield or spontaneously growing wings to fly. Arrow also appears to be able to operate his Briheight for far longer than most people, once keeping Muga manifested for nearly five hours while the average user struggles to maintain their armor for more than one or two hours. It is later revealed that Arrow was sent to Lingalind by "God" to destroy the continent and all of its inhabitants. When his destructive power manifests, he is unable to remove his Bind Warper and deactivate Muga and the Briheight seemingly moves on its own beyond his control, emitting a golden light that erases Conviction Particles and kills whoever it touches.

Edger Village / Granedger United

The sheriff of Edger Village after her father passed away. Her Briheight  manifests as a pink and white feminine humanoid that can use whip-like weapons stored in its forearms. However, her gentle nature makes Ryuju fairly weak in combat. Ryuju possesses a special attack named "Lightning Whip" that allows her to charge her whip weapons with electrical energy. Later, Atlee is named queen of the new nation Granedger United, based on the flying dreadnought Granedger.

Granddaughter of Burk Lean, chief of Edger Village. Her Briheight is the yellow and green , a feminine form equipped with basic blasters mounted on the forearms and wings. Shadoh's primary ability, derived from Elsha's Conviction , is to merge with the flying dreadnought , acting as the figurehead on its prow and allowing Elsha to steer it. Granedger is initially buried beneath Edger Village, but is awakened by Elsha manifesting Shadoh for the first time. Its emergence destroys the village, forcing its inhabitants to move to the ship and accompany Arrow on his journey. Later it is revealed that Granedger can be kept on course without Shadoh by using a Residual Conviction System built into the ship, but requires Shadoh to be attached for anything more complex. Soon after departing on Granedger, Elsha's grandfather steps down as chief of the village, passing the title to her. She later steps down from being chief of the village to allow Atlee to become the queen of Granedger United, claiming that helming Granedger with Shadoh is a big enough responsibility on its own.

Chief of Edger Village and Elsha's grandfather. He is highly distrustful of outsiders and disapproves of Edger's villagers being brought along on Arrow's journey, fearing that the World Wall will curse his people should they continue.

A longtime friend of Atlee and Elsha. Despite his boastful, arrogant attitude, he is actually rather cowardly and unlucky. He avoided his village's coming-of-age trials and is inclined to take the easy option in a difficult situation. As a result, he is easily fooled and swayed by more intelligent and willful people. Because of these traits, his allies often have difficulty determining Bit's worth as part of the Granedger crew, though Shū Bi names him  (an ultimately meaningless title) to placate his ego. Bit's Briheight  manifests as a giant Bind Warper, which can attach to Granedger to allow it to assume the giant humanoid mecha form Briheight Granedger.

Edger Village's doctor, a man possessing vast knowledge of Bind Warpers and Briheights, and their connection to the user's willpower and Conviction. He claims to have wandered the world for some time before settling in Edger Village. He was formerly the Armored Supreme of Lutoh, but was forced to leave after he caused the accident that created Fine Forté's split personality.

Rekka's former High Diviner, an eccentric scientist who monitors Rakuho capsule arrivals and directs the army to retrieve them. He has been friends with general Kai Rhodan since childhood. He and Kai were sold into slavery as children and have worked their way up as part of a plan change Rekka's government from within. He seemingly betrays Rekka and his promise to Kai to join up with the Granedger crew, finding Arrow irresistibly interesting. In contrast to his intelligence, Shū's stamina is incredibly poor and he quickly tires out after only a few moments of light jogging.

Republic of Rekka

Emperor of Rekka. Despite his advanced age and frail appearance, he has a phenomenally strong Conviction: , granting his Briheight  enough raw power to level the surrounding landscape with a gesture. Ogen also has the ability to absorb Conviction from other Briheights in order to repair itself. Because of the sheer power of his Conviction, normal Bind Warpers break down over time as he battles, requiring him to use multiple devices simultaneously to maintain Ogen for any significant period of time. He is also able to easily defeat Briheights using only a handheld wire weapon. He has also displayed the ability to de-age himself, becoming a fit and well-built younger man. In this state, Ogen discards its cloak and becomes much faster and more agile. Zetsu's Conviction grants him so much raw power that he is easily able to counter Arrow's abilities solely by regenerating Ogen faster than Muga can erase it.

Chancellor of the Republic of Rekka, a greedy and conniving noble.

Rekka's Northern General.

Rekka's Western General. His Briheight  is themed after an Eastern dragon and is armed with a spear with a beam tip. His Conviction is  granting his spear weapon near limitless range.

A general in Rekka's army and Shū Bi's childhood friend. He and Shū Bi were sold into slavery by their hometown as children and they have plotted since then change Rekka from the inside. Shu's betrayal deeply hurt him and has caused him to swear vengeance on both Shu and Arrow (who inspired him to leave). He later gains the ability to merge Gigan with Ren Sin's Reppu, creating , which shares their abilities and Convictions.

A devoted, high-ranking soldier in Rekka's army, often accompanying Shū Bi when he ventures out into the world and later becoming Kai Rhodan's subordinate. She has a cold and tough exterior, but Shū Bi claims she is an excellent cook and she is easily flustered when teased. Originally loyal to Shu, his betrayal has filled her with hatred and rage towards him, and she has become fully devoted to serving Kai and killing Shu. Her Briheight was initially named  and possessed great speed and agility, but after training and reasserting her Conviction, it evolves into . Reppu possesses wings and the ability to merge with Kai Rhodan's Gigan to form , combining Gigan's strength with Reppu's speed and flight.

 Rekka's Prime Minister. He is designated the helmsman of Dairekka, a flying dreadnought unearthed in the nation's far north region.

A group of four mercenaries with their own individual elemental-themed Briheights who sometimes work for the Republic of Rekka.

Supremacy of Lutoh
The Supremacy of Lutoh is controlled by six nobles, called the Six Supremes, with Princess Fine Forte as the head of state and advocate of peace.

The pacifistic Princess Supreme of Lutoh, who strongly believes in the power of love and diplomacy. Despite her gentle and kind public demeanor, she also possesses a vulgar, aggressive and dark split personality named , signified by red eyes and a darker, wilder hairstyle. Finoir first manifested herself after Fine underwent a blood transfusion following an accident caused by Sola Athin (then Werner Conrad). Fine later seals this personality using a Bind Warper, turning the device black, but has trouble keeping it under control. She later uses this Bind Warper to manifest the Briheight  with her Conviction , granting it the ability to absorb attacks and redirect the energy as rays of light that can repair Briheights and heal wounds. When Finoir asserts herself, Lovsolute becomes . This form twists Fine's Conviction and instead of healing others, Lovsolute-Noir absorbs Conviction from other Briheights in order to heal and empower itself.

 A Commander in the Lutoh military and Lutoh's current Armored Supreme. She is nicknamed "Prax the Bloodstained" for her habit of violently retaliating to any perceived disrespect towards Princess Fine stemming from her Conviction . She is also known as "Bratty Prax" for her stubborn and haughty nature. Her Briheight  possesses the unique ability to fly unassisted, which Shū determines is an artificial power granted by Lutoh somehow modifying Prax's Bind Warper. It also possesses a saber and a shoulder cape that can separate into remotely-guided beam weapons.

One of the members of Fine's Council of Advisers. After the revolution that turns the country into a Republic, he takes the role of leader of the new nation for himself, using a Bind Warper to take command of the flying dreadnought Maestrog'', originally buried under Lutoh's Maestrog Castle.

A maniacal scientist working for Lutoh. He takes particular glee in experimenting on people and has a chorus of scientists under his employ who sing while he experiments.

A member of the Prax Armored Division of Lutoh's military, possessing a green-hued Briheight. After the revolution, he and almost the entire Armored Division mass desert for the newfound Granadger United, turning into the Royal Guard of Queen Atlee.

A member of the Prax Armored Division of Lutoh's military, possessing a blue-hued Briheight. He, like most members of the Prax Armored Division, defects to Granedger United after the revolution.

The Elect Supreme, responsible for choosing the ruler of Lutoh. Rudolf has informants everywhere, which commands a great deal of reverence and fear among the Lutoh populace. Though initially appearing as a massively obese middle-aged man, his true appearance is that of a tall, muscular, and handsome young man, which is referred to as his "audience form." He maintains his obese appearance and constantly indulges in hedonistic pleasures in order to keep himself lazy and distracted, claiming his Conviction has the potential to destroy the world if he ever gets serious. He claims he is not human and is the agent of God who has manipulated Lingalind for years as part of God's plans.

Rudolf Conductore's assistant, a young woman dressed in a jester-like outfit, who has the ability to alter her appearance. Her Briheight  similarly has the ability to project illusions and camouflage itself.

Iki Territory

 President of the Iki Territory which forms an uneasy alliance with Lutoh Republic to capture Back Arrow.

A vigilante military commander who is sent to retrieve Arrow. He has a habit of spouting clichéd one-liners and exclaiming that he always wanted to say them.

Pretty Boys

Leader of the Pretty Boys, a group of genetically-engineered and unusually handsome young men who were bred as livestock as part of cruel Conviction experiments conducted by Severn Walston. The group escaped and lived in hiding in the autonomous Walston Province on the outskirts of Lutoh's territory. His Briheight is a fairly basic model, which is shared by all of the Pretty Boys.

Other characters

References

Back Arrow